Vijayakumari is an Indian stage, television and film actress. She was a stage actress at Kerala People's Arts Club and Kalidasa Kalakendra. She is the winner of the Kerala State award for best stage actress. She received the Kerala Sangeetha Nataka Akademi Award in 1976 and the Kerala Sangeetha Nataka Akademi Fellowship in 2005. Currently she is the Secretary of Kalidasa Kalakendra.

Early and personal life
Vijayakumari was born to Paramu Panicker and Bhargaviyamma at Kollam. Her father was a boat captain and her mother was a cashew nut worker in a cashew factory at Kollam. Her father died when she was very young. She has a younger sister. She had her primary education from Cantonment School, Kollam.

She is married to O. Madhavan. They have three children, Mukesh, Sandhya Rajendran, (both are actors) and Jayasree Syamlal . Sandhya's husband, E. A. Rajendran is also a film actor.

Filmography
 Ayisha (1964) .... Suhra
 Kochumon (1965) .... Gracy
 Kaattupookkal (1965)
 Thaara (1970) .... Kaalikutty
 Ningalenne Communistakki (1970)...Kalyani
 Panchavankaadu (1971) .... Naniyachi
 Lora Nee Evide (1971)
 Agnimrigam (1971)
 Oru Sundariyude Katha (1972)...Kunjiyamma 
 Achanum Baappayum (1972) .... Yashodha 
 Thottavadi (1973)
 Rajankanam (1976)
 Anavaranam (1976)
 Vedikkettu (1980)
 Venal (1980)
 Nattuchakkiruttu (1981)
 Artham (1989)
 Shubhayathra (1990)
 Aparna (1993)
 City Police (1993) ... Voice only
 Thenali (2000) ... Kamakshi
 Nandanam (2002) ... Parootty Amma
 Mizhi Randilum (2003)... Yashodhara
 Ammakilikoodu (2003) ...Kouslaya
 Jalolsavam (2004) ...Pappiyamma
 Madhuchandralekha (2006)...Chandramathi's mother
 Chiratta Kalippattangal (2006) .... Grandmother
 Chota Mumbai (2007)... Nadeshan's mother
 Heart Beats (2007)... Therutha chedathi
 Chandranilekkoru Vazhi (2008) ... Thumba
 Meghatheertham (2009) ... Artist
 Kadaaksham (2010) .... Old lady
 Chithrakkuzhal (2010) 
 Anwar (2010) .... Umma
 Thaappana (2012) ... Bhavani
 Hide n' Seek (2012) ... Niranjan's mother
 Nadan (2013) ... Icheyi
 Ottamandaaram (2014) 
 Karnavar (2014) ... Muthassi
 Veyilum Mazhayum (2014) ... Grandma
 Oru Second Class Yathra (2015) ... Old lady on the train
 Parayanullath (2015) ... Amma 
 Olappeeppi (2016) ... Sreedharan's mother
 Oru KPAC Kaalam (2017) ... Herself
 Bottle Lockdown (2020) ... Omana
 Vidhi:The Verdict (2021) .... Eliyamma
 Acquarium (2022) ... Lady at garden
 Turning Point (2022)
  Ormakalil - a mother's passion (2022)
 Kanneerinum Madhuram

Television serials
 Pranayavarnangal
 Ezhilam Pala
Manassu Parayunna Karyangal
 Mukesh Kathakal
 Neelaviriyitta Jalakam 
 Santhwanam {telefilm}

Drama
Ningalenne Communistakki
Mudiyanaya Puthran
Doctor
Puthiya Akasham Puthiya Bhoomi
 Kadalpalam
 Yudhabhoomi
 Althara
 Ramanan
 Swantham Leghakan
 Rainbow

References

External links

Actresses in Malayalam cinema
21st-century Indian actresses
Actresses from Kollam
Living people
Indian film actresses
Year of birth missing (living people)
Indian stage actresses
Actresses in Malayalam theatre
Indian television actresses
Actresses in Malayalam television
20th-century Indian actresses
Recipients of the Kerala Sangeetha Nataka Akademi Fellowship
Recipients of the Kerala Sangeetha Nataka Akademi Award